The Lagos State Scholarship Board is a governmental body that oversee and manage matters relating to scholarship, education and bursary in Lagos State. Established in February 1968 by the Lagos State Government, the body aims at providing “educational assistance to the needy for the development of Lagos State”.

Mission 
To become a leading organization in the provision of financial aid to students in Lagos State.

Awardees selection
Bursary and scholarship awards are only allocated to selected students in basic, secondary and tertiary institutions based on the recommendation from a selected panel of members from the five divisions of the state. Applicants for any of these awards must be Lagos State indigenes.

Departments
The Lagos State Scholarship Board consists of nine departments headed under the Office of the Special Adviser on Education. They include:
Board Secretary
Bursary
Foreign Scholarship
Local Scholarship
Administration/Personnel
Accounts
Press & Public Relations
Planning, Statistics & Budget
Procurement.

See also
Lagos State Government

References

Education in Lagos State
Scholarship Board